Lycopus is a genus of Asian crab spiders first described by Tamerlan Thorell in 1895.

Species
 it contains ten species:
Lycopus atypicus Strand, 1911 — Indonesia (Moluccas), New Guinea
Lycopus bangalores (Tikader, 1963) — India
Lycopus cha Tang & Li, 2010 — China
Lycopus edax Thorell, 1895 — Myanmar
Lycopus kochi Kulczyński, 1911 — New Guinea
Lycopus longissimus Tang & Li, 2010 — China
Lycopus primus Tang & Li, 2009 — China
Lycopus rubropictus Workman, 1896 — Singapore
Lycopus tabulatus Tang & Li, 2010 — China
Lycopus trabeatus Simon, 1895 — India

References

Thomisidae
Thomisidae genera
Taxa named by Tamerlan Thorell